Murphy's Law is the second album from American rock band, Murphy's Law.

It was released in 1986 on Profile Records which was attempting to broaden its horizons from the rap genre it was generally known for at that time.

It follows the band's debut, Bong Blast in 1983, and was re-issued by Another Planet records in 1994 with Back With A Bong on the same disc.

Overview
Murphy's Law were at the forefront of the New York hardcore movement in the early 1980s – but there was something inherently different about their sound.

They did have the hallmarks of their peers – fast paced, short songs with mosh sections which pleased the crowds – but they also managed to blend in some laid-back Californian punk sounds, mutant rock and roll, even blues into the stomping New York hardcore anthems.

Some of the songs on this album could also be credited as an influence on the burgeoning thrash metal scene which had taken to incorporating elements of New York hardcore into their sound and general song structure – for instance, Anthrax and S.O.D., whose Speak English or Die album pre-empted this release.

However, whilst they shared a common interest in the lyrical themes of drinking, smoking, and partying with the likes of Boston hardcore band, Gang Green – another trait which separates them from the socio-political leanings of fellow NYHC bands – they were never going to go down the metal road, although on later albums they did diversify into experimentations with ska.

Highlights on this album include the self-titled opener, "Care Bear" and the Iggy Pop cover version, "I Got A Right".

Track listing
All songs written by Murphy's Law, unless stated
"Murphy's Law"	–	1:48
"California Pipeline"	–	1:33
"Sit Home and Rot"	–	1:35
"Fun"	–	2:06
"Beer"	–	1:55
"Wahoo Day"	–	0:32
"Crucial Bar-B-Q"	–	2:30
"A Day in the Life"	–	1:50
"Care Bear"	–	2:56
"Ilsa"	–	2:38
"Skinhead Rebel"	–	1:16
"I Got a Right" (Iggy Pop)	–	2:36

Personnel
 Jimmy "Gestapo" Drescher – vocals
 Alex Morris – guitar
 Petey Hines – drums, backing vocals
 Pete Martinez – bass
 Recorded July, 1986 at Sound Ideas and Evergreen Studios, New York City, USA
 Produced and engineered by Robert Musso for Action Entertainment Group, Inc
 Assistant engineered by Dary S
 Mixed at 39th Street Studios and Quadrasonic, New York City, USA
 Cover illustration by Alex Morris
 1994 re-issue remastered by Alan Douches at West West Side Music

External links
Murphy's Law official website

Profile Records albums
1986 albums
Murphy's Law (band) albums